Pittsburgh, surrounded by rivers and hills, has a unique transportation infrastructure that includes roads, tunnels, bridges, railroads, inclines, bike paths, and stairways.

Roads and infrastructure

Streets

Pittsburgh is home to several notable streets. Roslyn Place is a small wooden-paved cul-de-sac located in the Shadyside neighborhood of Pittsburgh, Pennsylvania. The street was built in 1914 in the Nicolson Pavement style and is home to the historic Roslyn Place district.

Canton Avenue is the steepest officially recorded public street in the United States.

East Carson Street has one of the largest concentrations of 19th-century homes, which has prompted outsiders to call the neighborhood the City's Georgetown. It includes many bars and restaurants as well as residences.

Grant Street is the main government and business corridor in Pittsburgh, Pennsylvania. It is home to the global headquarters of U.S. Steel, Koppers Chemicals, Federated Investors, and Oxford Development. It also is home to the seat of Allegheny County, City of Pittsburgh and the regional Federal Government offices. It is part of the Pittsburgh Central Downtown Historic District.

Expressways
Pittsburgh has a high number of freeze/thaw cycles in the winter, sometimes blamed for the difficulty of maintaining local roads. The hills and rivers form many barriers to transportation within the city.

The main highway connecting Pittsburgh to the Pennsylvania Turnpike (I-76) on the east is I-376, known to locals as the "Parkway East." It includes the locally-notorious Squirrel Hill interchange, where unusual traffic patterns and the adjoining tunnel often cause traffic congestion. Several accidents have involved tall trucks getting stuck against the tunnel roof. Also part of I-376 is the "Parkway West," which leads from downtown Pittsburgh to the Pittsburgh International Airport's main terminal and leads into the contiguous Airport Parkway and Southern Expressway. I-279, known as the "Parkway North," runs north of the city to merge with I-79. It connects the city with the North Hills and the Cranberry area. There is no "Parkway South".

I-579, or the "Crosstown Boulevard," is a spur off of I-279 that alleviates downtown and North Shore traffic headed north or south and to events at either the convention center or the PPG Paints Arena.

North of the city, the Parkway North and a short section of Interstate 579 over the Veterans Bridge have reversible high occupancy vehicle HOV lanes for rush-hour commuting, which require a minimum of two occupants per vehicle for use; no electric/hybrid vehicle "HOV OK" program has yet been made available. On August 25, 1995, six people were killed in a head-on collision on the HOV lanes after PennDOT employee William Dean Snyder failed to follow procedures.  Snyder maintained open the traffic gates for both directions simultaneously.

Belt system

Unlike many other major U.S. cities, Pittsburgh lacks a dedicated contiguous beltway surrounding the city. I-76 (Pennsylvania Turnpike), I-79, and I-70 form a roughly triangular-shaped "beltway," but the distance of these roads from the city center and the need to exit and enter each leg in order to continue circling the city render them impractical as a beltway; commuters are forced to use secondary roads to go from suburb to suburb. The Allegheny County Belt System is an attempt at dealing with this without building additional infrastructure. The Pittsburgh Wayfinder System is a similar system that aims to guide travelers to popular destinations and services in the city proper.

Bridges and tunnels

Pittsburgh is a city of bridges: over 2,000 bridges dot the landscape of Allegheny County. The southern entrance to Downtown is through the Fort Pitt Tunnel and then over the Fort Pitt Bridge.

The Panhandle Bridge, a former railroad bridge, carries Pittsburgh Regional Transit's Blue and Red (formerly 42S/47L) light rail lines across the Monongahela River. Other notable bridges are Fort Duquesne Bridge, the Liberty Bridge, and The Three Sisters.

Notable tunnels include two interstate highway tunnels on I-376, Fort Pitt Tunnel and Squirrel Hill Tunnel; major traffic tunnels Armstrong Tunnel and Liberty Tunnels; the light rail tunnel, Mt. Washington Transit Tunnel, the Schenley Tunnel, the Wabash Tunnel and Corliss Tunnel.

Regional mass transit

Local public transportation is coordinated by Pittsburgh Regional Transit, the 14th-largest urban mass transit system in the United States.  It services , including all of Allegheny County and portions of Armstrong, Beaver, Washington, and Westmoreland counties. PRT maintains a network of intracity bus routes, two inclines on Mt. Washington above Downtown (mostly a tourist attraction rather than a means of commuting), and a light rail/busway system. The transit agency discontinued its commuter rail system, the PATrain, in 1989, However, A New Line To Arnold Has Been Proposed Since 2009.

Pittsburgh Light Rail 

The light rail network is a direct descendant of the original streetcar system, which once numbered dozens of lines and included interurban routes to neighboring cities such as Washington and Charleroi. Although most is on dedicated right-of-way, including the Mt. Washington Transit Tunnel, trains still street run in the Beechview neighborhood. Once across the Monongahela River trains enter a subway to serve Downtown Pittsburgh. Since March 2012, the North Shore Connector has extended service across the Allegheny River, via tunnel, to such destinations as PNC Park, Heinz Field, and Rivers Casino.

Pittsburgh Bus Rapid Transit

PAT operates over 800 buses on both standard routes and bus rapid transit routes in Allegheny County. The latter use high-speed articulated buses that run at grade and above ground on their own right-of-way with platform stations, much like a rail system. In some instances, such as the Mount Washington tunnel, these buses travel along paved sections of the light rail line. There are currently three routes: the South Busway, from downtown to the southern part of Allegheny County, the Martin Luther King Jr. East Busway, from the Amtrak station to the eastern suburbs, and the West Busway, to the western suburbs. Future plans include extending the West Busway to the Pittsburgh International Airport.

All light rail/busway stations outside the downtown have PAT station shuttles that serve the surrounding neighborhoods, and sections of the metropolitan area not served by the light rail/busway system, including most of the northern suburbs, have regular PAT bus routes.  The mass transit systems of Beaver, Fayette, Lawrence, Washington, and Westmoreland counties (including Mid Mon Valley Transit Authority) operate their own commuter shuttles to and from the city; the private company Myers Coach Line operates commuter service from Butler County. The mass transit system of Monongalia County, West Virginia also provides connections to Pittsburgh. In early 2005 the Southwestern Pennsylvania Commission proposed combining Pittsburgh Regional Transit, then known as Port Authority, with the nine surrounding metro counties transit agencies.

Intercity passenger bus and rail

Grant Street Transportation Center 

Megabus, Greyhound Lines, and Fullington Trailways connect Pittsburgh with distant cities by bus; Greyhound and Fullington Trailways buses stop at the Grant Street Transportation Center intercity bus terminal.  Popular destinations include Philadelphia, New York City, and Washington, D.C.

Pittsburgh Union Station

Two Amtrak trains serve Penn Station: the Pennsylvanian to New York City via Philadelphia, and the Capitol Limited between Washington, D.C. and Chicago, which uses CSX from Washington to Pittsburgh's outer perimeter, the AVR on the P&W Subdivision through the Panther Hollow Tunnel in the university district, and NS from the AVR interchange through Penn Station to Chicago.

Airports

Pittsburgh International Airport

The city is served by Pittsburgh International Airport in suburban Findlay Township, Pennsylvania, formerly a hub and key focus city for US Airways.

Other Pittsburgh area airports
General aviation is served by the Allegheny County Airport. Its terminal is of a 1920s art-deco design. It once hosted Charles Lindbergh and handles 139,000 private and corporate-jet flights a year.

A secondary reliever airport is in the eastern suburb of Latrobe, Pennsylvania.  Over the last few decades the Arnold Palmer Regional Airport has been served by 2-3 daily flights from US Airways, Northwest Airlines/Delta Air Lines, and presently Spirit Airlines, as well as serving as a general aviation hub for east hills communities.

Other area airports include:

North Metro:
Butler County Airport
Zelienople Municipal Airport
Rock Airport
New Castle Municipal Airport
Lakehill Airport
South Metro:
Allegheny County Airport
Rostraver Airport 
Joseph A. Hardy Connellsville Airport
Washington County Airport
East Metro:
Pittsburgh-Monroeville Airport
Greensburg Jeannette Regional Airport
Indiana County-Jimmy Stewart Airport
West Metro:
Beaver County Airport
Eddie Dew Memorial Airpark (Ohio)
Jefferson County Airpark (Ohio)
Herron Airport (West Virginia)
Wheeling Airport (West Virginia)

Pedestrians and bicycling

Trails

Pittsburgh has a thriving cycling community despite steep hills and variable weather. Efforts have been made to incorporate the bicycle into the transportation system. The Three Rivers Heritage Trail encompasses all the trails in the city.  The Eliza Furnace Trail, known locally as the "Jail Trail", stretches from Downtown (at the Allegheny County Jail) to the East End region, where trail access can be found along some roads. The North Shore Trail spans from the Alcosan plant along the Ohio River and continues along the Allegheny River to Millvale.  The Southside Trail follows the Monongahela River and beyond Baldwin Borough connects to McKeesport via the Great Allegheny Passage.  This trail, in connection with the C&O Canal Trail, forms a continuous motorist-free route from Point State Park in Pittsburgh to Washington, D.C.  PAT has installed bike racks on all buses and it allows bikes on its subway/busway system at all times.

Bike Pittsburgh (BikePGH) is the local bicycle advocacy group and is working to make Pittsburgh increasingly safe, accessible, and friendly to bicycle transportation. The non-profit bike collective,Free Ride, recycles bicycles and bike parts, teaches bicycle construction, and has programs to sell or earn a rebuilt bicycle. Additionally, bicycles can be borrowed at two places along the Heritage Trail through the Friends of the Riverfront/Dasani Blue Bikes program.

In 2014, the City began installing segregated bike lanes, which provide greater physical safety to the biker.
On September 6, bike lanes that stretch from Downtown Pittsburgh to the 16th Street Bridge on Penn Avenue were installed. In order to accommodate these bike lanes, the Westbound lane of Penn Avenue was removed, making it one way. Other segregated bike lanes were installed on Schenley Drive in Oakland, and Saline Street in Greenfield.

The "Healthy Ride" bicycle-sharing system entered service in Spring, 2016, supplied by Nextbike. Price is $2 per half-hour, or $12 or $20 per month.

Inclines and staircases

Two inclines ascend Mount Washington: Duquesne Incline and Monongahela Incline. Pittsburgh had considerably more inclines and the Monongahela Incline was paralleled by a freight incline.

Pittsburgh has more public staircases (737) than any other city in the United States, followed by Cincinnati and San Francisco. Many of these staircases have street names, and lead to hillside neighborhoods that can be difficult to access by car in winter.

Freight Railroads
During the heyday of the steel industry, Pittsburgh was among the largest rail centers not only in the nation, but the world. For many years, the multiple rail crossings in the suburb of Port Perry at the mouth of Turtle Creek on the Monongahela River and adjacent to the Edgar Thomson Works and Duquesne mills, was the highest concentration of freight traffic in the world. Even today, with river traffic included, Port Perry is often very near or at the top of the list. The Conway Yard to the west of the city along the Ohio River was the largest rail yard in the world from 1956 until 1980.  From the beginning of the industrial era in America through its collapse in the 1980s, Pittsburgh was a key market for the nation's largest and most important railroads (most notably the Pennsylvania Railroad [the largest company in the world for much of the 20th century], and the New York Central Railroad [via the Pittsburgh & Lake Erie], Baltimore & Ohio and Pittsburgh & West Virginia). Despite the near-complete collapse of heavy industry in the Northeast, Pittsburgh remains an extremely important link in the nation's rail network.
Current railroads in Pittsburgh include:

Class I railroads

Norfolk Southern (NS)
Norfolk Southern operates the former assets of Conrail, composed of the Pennsylvania Railroad, instrumental in the formation of modern Pittsburgh. NS operates three lines through Pittsburgh:

the original line, the Pittsburgh Line, from U.S. Steel's Edgar Thomson Steel Mill in Braddock, PA, over the Allegheny River near Downtown Pittsburgh, into Island Ave Yard where it becomes the Fort Wayne Line;
the Mon Line, along the south bank of the Monongahela River from West Brownsville, PA, to Island Ave Yard, formerly the Pittsburgh, Virginia and Charleston Railroad.  This line is used by coal trains from southern Pennsylvania and trains with over-height cars that cannot fit under the roof of Penn Station on the Pittsburgh Line, accessing it via a branch just east of Braddock to the Port Perry bridge. The Mon Line joins the Fort Wayne Line at Island Ave Yard after crossing the Ohio River on the Ohio Connecting (OC) Railroad bridge;
the Conemaugh Line, along the north shore of the Allegheny River, serving several coal branch lines and power plants. Operations are centered on a small yard in Etna, PA.

On the Mon and Pittsburgh lines over 60 trains a day pass through the city.

CSX
CSX operates the former Baltimore & Ohio Railroad (B&O) and the Pittsburgh and Lake Erie Railroad (P&LE). Many of the old B&O lines have been removed or are unused. Formerly an important part of the B&O system, Glenwood Yard is leased and operated by the Allegheny Valley Railroad for local jobs. The yard used to give access to the B&O's Grant Street Station in Downtown Pittsburgh. The building has been rebuilt into a PNC Bank building and the old right-of-way is now a bike path. The B&O main line, which cuts north and under across Pittsburgh by the Schenley Tunnel, is now used by the AVR. The 33rd Street Railroad Bridge over the Allegheny River is still used: AVR trains connect with Norfolk Southern's Pittsburgh Line about a mile east of Penn Station. CSX freight trains use the former P&LE through McKeesport, PA, and Braddock, PA, before crossing the Mononghela River into Homestead, PA. The P&LE line and the Mon Line run side by side until the Mon Line crosses the Ohio Connecting Railroad Bridge at McKees Rocks, Pennsylvania. On an average day, the P&LE line carries about 30–35 trains.

Class II railroads

Wheeling & Lake Erie
The Wheeling & Lake Erie is a regional railroad incorporated in 1990 after the Norfolk and Western Railway sold trackage from the original Wheeling & Lake Erie Railroad.
Wheeling and Lake Erie R.R.

Bessemer & Lake Erie
The Bessemer & Lake Erie Railroad runs north from the North Bessemer Yard in Penn Hills to Conneaut, Ohio.  In 2004, the B&LE was purchased by Canadian National Railway.

Class III railroads

Allegheny Valley Railroad
The Allegheny Valley Railroad runs mostly on former Pennsylvania Railroad and Baltimore & Ohio Railroad lines.
AVR (Allegheny Valley Railroad)

Pittsburgh and Ohio Central Railroad
The Pittsburgh and Ohio Central Railroad operates former Pennsylvania Railroad trackage on the Chartiers Branch and the Panhandle Route to the southwest.

Union Railroad
Union Railroad mainly serves the last remaining steel mills in the city.  It has interchanges with the B&LE at North Bessemer.

See also

References

 
Pittsburgh